S. fragilis may refer to:

 Salinator fragilis, an air-breathing land snail species
 Salix euxina, a non-hybrid species
 Salix × fragilis, the hybrid between Salix euxina and Salix alba
 Sinocoelurus fragilis, a theropod dinosaur species from the Upper Jurassic
 Skania fragilis, a fossil arthropod species from the Cambrian
 Swainsona fragilis, a flowering plant species in the genus Swainsona native to Australasia

See also
 Fragilis (disambiguation)